Kala Art Institute is a community arts non-profit organization, artist residency, art classes, and an art gallery, founded in 1974, and located in two locations in Berkeley, California.

About 
They offer facilities for printmaking, photography, and book arts. Classes include etching, letterpress, and bookbinding. The studio building is located at 1060 Heinz Avenue in an industrial building and was a former Heinz ketchup factory. The art gallery space is located at 2990 San Pablo Avenue and is 2,200 square feet, this secondary space was from an expansion in 2009.

It is estimated that Kala Art Institute serves between 25,000 and 35,000 people a year.

History 
Horsting and Nakano met while studying at Atelier 17, under Krishna Reddy and Stanley William Hayter. The first facility for Kala started on Wilmot Street in Japantown, San Francisco; with a single etching press with a hot plate. Six months after first opening, they moved Kala to Ashby Street (near Ashby BART) in Berkeley in order to gain more space. In 1976, Kala became a 501(c)3 organization.

In 2009, the Oakland Museum of California held the exhibition, “Evolution of Print: Artists of Kala,” at the Oakland International Airport. Artists associated with Kala Art Institute have included Squeak Carnwath, Roy De Forest, Margaret Herscher, Jessica Dunne, Bella Feldman, Barbara Foster, Sonya Rapoport, Peter Voulkos, and William T. Wiley.

References

External links 
 

Art museums and galleries in California
Arts centers in California
1974 establishments in California
Art in the San Francisco Bay Area
Organizations based in Berkeley, California
Culture of Berkeley, California